Stanley Rauh (1898–1979) was an American screenwriter.

Selected filmography
 Melody in May (1936)
 Hold That Kiss (1938)
 Pier 13 (1940)
 Sleepers West (1941)
 A-Haunting We Will Go (1942)
 Career Girl (1944)

References

Bibliography
 Mayer, Geoffrey. Historical Dictionary of Crime Films. Scarecrow Press, 2012.

External links

1898 births
1979 deaths
Screenwriters from Ohio
Writers from Dayton, Ohio
20th-century American screenwriters